Mijo may refer to:

People
 Mijo Babić (1903–1941), Croatian fascist 
 Mijo Caktaš (born 1992), Croatian football player
 Mijo Dadić (born 1981), Croatian football player
 Mijo Gorski (born 1952), Croatian Roman Catholic prelate
 Mijo Kovačić (born 1935), Croatian painter and naïve artist
 Mijo Lončarić (born 1941), Croatian linguist
 Mijo Mihaljcic (born 1992), Serbian fashion model
 Mijo Miletic (born 1998), Bosnian-Herzegovinian football player
 Mijo Studenović (born 1985), Bosnian-Herzegovinian football defender
 Mijo Tunjić (born 1988), Dutch football player
 Mijo Udovčić (1920–1984), Yugoslavian chess player

Other
 "Mijo" (Better Call Saul), an episode of the television series Better Call Saul
 Mijo, a Spanish term of endearment; see